Eagle Lake First Nation is an Ojibwe First Nation in northwestern Ontario. It has a reserve named Eagle Lake 27.

References

Ojibwe reserves in Ontario
Communities in Kenora District